Elgar Baeza (born 8 November 1939) is a Uruguayan former footballer. He played in five matches for the Uruguay national football team from 1965 to 1967. He was also part of Uruguay's squad for the 1967 South American Championship.

References

External links
 

1939 births
Living people
Uruguayan footballers
Uruguay international footballers
Place of birth missing (living people)
Association football defenders
Danubio F.C. players
Club Atlético River Plate (Montevideo) players
Club Nacional de Football players
Alianza F.C. footballers
Peñarol players
Centro Atlético Fénix players
Uruguayan expatriate footballers
Expatriate footballers in Peru